The Treaty of Serbian–Albanian Alliance, also known as the Treaty of Niš, was a secret treaty signed in Niš between Essad Pasha Toptani and prime minister Nikola Pašić of Kingdom of Serbia on 17 September 1914.

Background 

On 17 May 1914 Essad Pasha Toptani was accused of assisting the Peasant Revolt against William of Wied. He was exiled to Italy on 20 May without trial. In Italy, he was received with honor since both Italian and Austrian representatives played roles in intrigues that surrounded the revolt. Only a week after prince Wilhelm of Wied's departure from Durres on 3 September 1914, another violent revolt arose. The rebels managed to lay siege on Durres, imprison Wied's supporters, to call for Muslim prince and to establish the Senate for Central Albania.

The Treaty 

In autumn 1914 Essad Pasha decided to accept the invitation of the Senate of Central Albania to return and lead them. First he travelled to Niš, Kingdom of Serbia, where he and Serbian prime minister Nikola Pašić signed the secret treaty of Serbian-Albanian alliance on 17 September 1914. The treaty was signed in Banovina building (which has been part of the University of Niš since 1966), which is close to Niš fortress.

The treaty had fifteen points which set up Serbian-Albanian political and military institutions and the military alliance of Albania and the Kingdom of Serbia. The treaty envisaged a rail-road to Durres, the financial and military support of the Kingdom of Serbia to Essad Pasha's position as Albanian ruler and it recorded the demarcation by a Serbo-Albanian commission. The treaty allowed Essad Pasha to change some clauses because the treaty would need the agreement of the Albanian National Assembly. This would be possible after Pasha was elected ruler. Serbia contracted to supply a military intervention to protect Pasha's rule and to subsidise his gendarmerie by paying 50,000 dinars per month for Albanian military supplies.

Aftermath
In October 1914 Essad Pasha returned to Albania. With Italian and Serbian financial backing he established armed forces in Dibër and captured the interior of Albania and Dures.

References 

Nis 1914
Nis 1914
Nis
Modern history of Albania
Serbia in World War I
Albania–Serbia relations